Gad Humphreys (? – October 25, 1859) was an officer in the United States military and an Indian agent in Florida. He was appointed to his post in 1822 and removed in 1830.

He met with Native Americans in Florida.

Historian Kevin D. Kokomoor wrote his dissertation on Humphries.

He was involved in slave claims. His property was burned during the Seminole Wars. He moved to St. Augustine. He died there in 1859.

See also
Fort King

References

External links
Findagrave entry
Thesis about Humphreys' role in slave claims

Year of birth missing
1859 deaths
Year of birth unknown
Military personnel from Florida